David J. Elliott is a musician and academic. He is a professor of music and music education at the Steinhardt School of Culture, Education, and Human Development of New York University, in New York in the United States. He previously taught at the University of Toronto in Canada. He has published several books, including:

 David J. Elliott (1995). Music Matters: A New Philosophy of Music Education. New York: Oxford University Press.
  (editor) (2005). Praxial Music Education: Reflections and Dialogues. New York: Oxford University Press.
 , Kari K. Veblen, Stephen J. Messenger, Marissa Silverman (editors) (2013). Community Music Today. New York: Rowman & Littlefield.
 , Marissa Silverman, Wayne D. Bowman (editors) (2016). Artistic Citizenship: Artistry, Social Responsibility, and Ethical Praxis. New York: Oxford University Press.

References 

University of Toronto alumni
Case Western Reserve University alumni
Steinhardt School of Culture, Education, and Human Development faculty
Living people
Year of birth missing (living people)